The anthracotheriines are an extinct subfamily of anthracotheres that comprised Paleogene to early Neogene North American and Eurasian artiodactyls. The group contained the genera Anthracotherium, Heptacodon, and Paenanthracotherium, as well as possibly Myaingtherium and Siamotherium. They were small to large sized anthracotheres, and when compared to the other two subfamilies, Microbunodontinae and Bothriodontinae, anthracotheriines are found to occupy a primitive, basal position in the family.

References

Anthracotheres
Mammal subfamilies
Eocene first appearances